Blue Mountain Lake is a  lake in Hamilton County, New York, in the central Adirondacks. Blue Mountain Lake is the eastern end of the Eckford chain of lakes. It is located west of Blue Mountain. The hamlet of Blue Mountain Lake lies on its southeastern shore and the Adirondack Museum looks down from high above its eastern shore. It has been a popular vacation destination since the mid-19th century.

Fishing
Fish species in the lake include lake trout, rainbow trout, smallmouth bass, landlocked salmon and smelt. There is only fee access at two private marina launches in the village of Blue Mountain Lake. There are also boat rentals available.

History
The Blue Mountain Lake House was built in 1874 by John G. Holland. Soon after, an earlier resident, Miles Tyler Merwin, enlarged his log cabin on a spur of Blue Mountain overlooking the lake into the Blue Mountain house; the Log Hotel is now on the grounds of the Adirondack Museum.  In 1881, Frederick C. Durant, cousin of William West Durant, built the Prospect House, the most luxurious hotel then existing in the Adirondacks; it was the first hotel in the world to have electric light in every room.

References

External links 
Adirondack Museum
Blue Mountain Lake Photos 1874-1950

Adirondacks
Lakes of New York (state)
Lakes of Hamilton County, New York
Tourist attractions in Hamilton County, New York